Walter Francis "Chick" Keating (August 8, 1891 – July 13, 1959) was a shortstop in Major League Baseball. He played for the Chicago Cubs and Philadelphia Phillies.

References

External links

Major League Baseball shortstops
Chicago Cubs players
Philadelphia Phillies players
Minor league baseball managers
Raleigh Red Birds players
Lynchburg Shoemakers players
Portsmouth Pirates players
Columbus Foxes players
Atlanta Crackers players
Buffalo Bisons (minor league) players
Syracuse Stars (minor league baseball) players
Jersey City Skeeters players
Bridgeport Bears (baseball) players
Binghamton Triplets players
Baseball players from Philadelphia
1891 births
1959 deaths